Fire Ex. is a punk rock band from Kaohsiung, Taiwan, founded in 2000, which sings in both Taiwanese Hokkien and Mandarin Chinese.  The group consists of Sam (vocals), Orio (guitar), Pipi (bass), and KG (drums).  The band is known for their social activism supporting Taiwanese independence and same-sex marriage.

During the Sunflower Student Movement in 2014, student activists occupying the Legislative Yuan frequently played their song "Goodnight, Taiwan" and asked them to write a new song for the movement.  This led to the writing of "Island's Sunrise" (島嶼天光), which became the unofficial anthem of the movement.  The band will play at SXSW in 2020.

Awards 

 Winner of the Song of the Year Award at the 26th Golden Melody Awards in 2015 for "Island's Sunrise"
 Nomianted for the Best Band Award at the 25th Golden Melody Awards in 2014 for Goodbye! You!th
 Nominated for the Album of the Year Award at the 28th Golden Melody Awards in 2017 for Reborn
 Nominated for the Best Band Award at the 29th Golden Melody Awards in 2018 for Begin the Second Half
 Nominated for the Song of the Year Award at the 29th Golden Melody Awards in 2018 for "Southbound Night Bus"
 Nominated for the Producer of the Year (Single) at the 29th Golden Melody Awards in 2018 for "Southbound Night Bus"

Discography 

 Let's Go! (2007)
 A Man On The Sea (2009)
 Goodbye! You!th (2013)
 REBORN (2016)
 Stand Up Like A Taiwanese (2019)
 Unsung heroes (2020)

References

External links 

Musicians from Kaohsiung
Musical groups established in 2000
Taiwanese Hokkien-language bands
Taiwanese punk rock groups
2000 establishments in Taiwan